The Imad Khamis government was the sixth Syrian government formed during the presidency of Bashar al-Assad, with Imad Khamis as Prime Minister. It was formed on 3 July 2016 after the 2016 parliamentary election. The government was the 94th since Syria gained independence from the Ottoman Empire in 1918 and was the sixth during presidency of Bashar al-Assad. On 11 June 2020, Khamis was fired and replaced by Hussein Arnous as a result of the country's economic crisis.

See also
Cabinet of Syria
Government ministries of Syria
List of prime ministers of Syria
List of foreign ministers of Syria

References 

2016 establishments in Syria
Bashar al-Assad
Governments of Syria
Government ministers of Syria
Lists of political office-holders in Syria
Cabinets established in 2016